Nutowo  is a settlement in the administrative district of Gmina Łanięta, within Kutno County, Łódź Voivodeship, in central Poland.

References

Nutowo